The Subcommittee on Domestic Policy was a standing committee within the United States House Committee on Oversight and Government Reform. Jurisdiction included domestic policies, including matters relating to energy, labor, education, criminal justice, the economy, as well as the Office of National Drug Control Policy.

Members, 111th Congress

External links
Subcommittee Homepage

Oversight Domestic Policy